"Bridge Burning" is a song by American rock band Foo Fighters. It was released as the fifth and final single from their seventh studio album Wasting Light, and as the sixth and final single in the United Kingdom. It is also the first track on the album. On March 16, 2012, the online music magazine Loudwire announced that Foo Fighters would be releasing "Bridge Burning" as a proper radio single. The song appears on the soundtrack to the video game Madden NFL 12.

Charts

Weekly charts

Year-end charts

References

Foo Fighters songs
2011 songs
2012 singles
Songs written by Dave Grohl
Song recordings produced by Butch Vig
Songs written by Pat Smear
Songs written by Taylor Hawkins
Songs written by Nate Mendel
Songs written by Chris Shiflett
RCA Records singles